The 2015/16 FIS Snowboard World Cup is 22nd multi race season in snowboarding. Competition consists of the parallel slalom, parallel giant slalom, snowboard cross, halfpipe, slopestyle and big air.

Calendar: Men

Parallel

Snowboard Cross

Big Air

Slopestyle

Halfpipe

Calendar: Ladies

Parallel

Snowboard Cross

Big Air

Slopestyle

Halfpipe

Calendar: Team events

Snowboard cross men

Snowboard cross ladies

Parallel mixed

Standings: Men

Parallel overall (PSL/PGS)

Standings after 7 races.

Parallel slalom

Standings after 4 races.

Parallel giant slalom

Standings after 3 races.

Snowboard Cross

Standings after 8 races.

Freestyle  overall (BA/SBS/HP)

Standings after 10 races.

Big Air

Standings after 2 races.

Slopestyle

Standings after 4 races.

Halfpipe

Standings after 4 races.

Standings:Ladies

Parallel overall (PSL/PGS)

Standings after 7 races.

Parallel slalom

Standings after 4 races.

Parallel giant slalom

Standings after 3 races.

Snowboard Cross

Standings after 8 races.

Freestyle  overall (BA/SBS/HP)

Standings after 10 races.

Big Air

Standings after 2 races.

Slopestyle

Standings after 4 races.

Halfpipe

Standings after 4 races

Footnotes

References

FIS Snowboard World Cup
FIS Snowboard World Cup
FIS Snowboard World Cup